This page is a list of Maltese saints, blesseds, venerables, and servants of God, as recognized by the Roman Catholic Church.

There are only two dioceses in the island group of Malta, and these are the Roman Catholic Archdiocese of Malta and its suffragan diocese, the Roman Catholic Diocese of Gozo. The first Maltese saint in the history of Malta is Saint Publius, who died around the year 112 A.D.

Saints
 Saint Publius (ca. 33–112 A.D.), first Bishop of Malta (Malta - Athens, Greece)
 Canonized: Pre-Congregation
 Saint Ġorġ Preca (1880–1962), Priest of the Archdiocese of Malta; Founder of the Society of Christian Doctrine; Member of the Third Order Carmelites (Valletta – Santa Venera, Malta)
 Declared "Venerable": June 28, 1999
 Beatified: May 9, 2001 by Pope John Paul II
 Canonized: June 3, 2007 by Pope Benedict XVI

Blesseds

 Blessed Teresa Pisani (Maria Adeodata) (1806–1855), Professed Religious of the Benedictine Nuns (Naples, Italy – Mdina, Malta)
 Declared "Venerable": April 24, 2001 
 Beatified: May 9, 2001 by Pope John Paul II
 Blessed Nazju Falzon (1813–1865), Cleric of the Archdiocese of Malta; Member of the Secular Franciscans (Valletta, Malta)
 Declared "Venerable": October 23, 1987 
 Beatified: May 9, 2001 by Pope John Paul II
 Blessed Jeanne Littlejohn (Angèle-Marie) (1933–1995), Professed Religious of the Missionary Sisters of Our Lady of Apostles; Martyr (Tunis, Tunisia – Algiers, Algeria)
Declared "Venerable": 26 January 2018
Beatified: December 8, 2018 by Cardinal Giovanni Angelo Becciu

Venerables
 Virginja de Brincat (Margerita of the Sacred Heart of Jesus) (1862–1952), Cofounder of the Franciscan Sisters of the Heart of Jesus (Gozo, Malta)
 Declared "Venerable": 27 January 2014

Servants of God

 Adelaide Cini (1838–1885), Layperson of the Archdiocese of Malta (Valletta – Ħamrun, Malta)
 Maria Teresa Nuzzo (1851–1923), Founder of the Daughters of the Sacred Heart (Valletta – Ħamrun, Malta)
 Isidor Formosa (1851–1931), Priest of the Archdiocese of Malta; Founder of the Ursuline Sisters of Malta (Valletta, Malta)
 Ġużeppi de Piro (1877–1933), Priest of the Archdiocese of Malta; Founder of the Missionary Society of Saint Paul (Mdina – Ħamrun, Malta)
 Franġisk Grima (1908–1939), Priest of the Diocese of Gozo (Gozo, Malta)
 Lwiġi Fenech (Avertan) (1871–1943), Professed Priest of the Carmelites of the Ancient Observance (Il-Mosta – Mdina, Malta)
 Ewgenju Borg (1886–1967), Layperson of the Archdiocese of Malta; Consecrated Member of the Society of Christian Doctrine (Isla – Ħamrun, Malta)
 Ġemma Camilleri (1889-1973), Professed Religious of the Franciscan Sisters of the Heart of Jesus (Gozo, Malta)
 Emanuel Galea (1891–1974), Auxiliary Bishop of Malta (Isla – Żejtun, Malta)
 Mikiel Azzopardi (1910–1987), Priest of the Archdiocese of Malta (Valletta, Malta)
 Henry Casolani (1917–1999) and Inez Vassallo Casolani (1915–1992), Married Layperson of the Archdiocese of Malta (Cospicua – Valletta, Malta)
 Mikiel Attard (1933–2004), Priest of the Diocese of Gozo (Gozo, Malta)
 Nazzareno Gauci (Grazzja) (1911–2005), Professed Priest of the Augustinians (Gozo – Birkirkara, Malta)
 Antonio Camilleri (Louis) (1923–2010), Professed Religious of the Brothers of the Christian Schools (De La Salle Brothers) (Żurrieq – Msida, Malta)

Candidates for sainthood
 Santo Benigno Grech (Rosario) (1723–1793), Professed Priest of the Dominicans (Valletta, Malta – Palermo, Italy)
 Pietro Pace (1831–1914), Bishop of Malta; Titular Archbishop of Rhodes (Gozo, Malta)
 Karmni Grima (1838–1922), Layperson of the Diocese of Gozo (Gozo, Malta)
 Ġużeppi Diacono (1847–1924), Priest of the Diocese of Gozo; Founder of the Franciscan Sisters of the Heart of Jesus (Gozo, Malta)
 Franġisk Portelli (1854–1926), Layperson of the Diocese of Gozo; Member of the Secular Franciscans (Gozo, Malta)
 Ġużepp Portelli (1880–1949), Priest of the Diocese of Gozo (Gozo, Malta)
 Carlo Manché (1905–1950), Priest of the Archdiocese of Malta (Valletta – Gzira, Malta)
 Emmanuela Vassallo (1942–1989), Professed Religious of the Franciscan Missionaries of Mary; Martyr (Valletta, Malta – Tripoli, Libya)
 Egidio Galea (1918–2005), Professed Priest of the Augustinians (Birgu, Malta)
 Guido de Marco (1931–2010), Married Layperson of the Archdiocese of Malta; President of Malta (Valletta – Msida, Malta)

References

External links
 "Hagiography Circle"

Malta
Servants of God
Maltese Roman Catholics
Saints
Saints
Saints